Kala (also Romanized as Kalā) is a village in Talkh Ab Rural District, Khenejin District, Farahan County, Markazi Province, Iran. At the 2006 census, its population was 109, in 34 families.

References 

Populated places in Farahan County